Aretha's Greatest Hits is the third compilation album by American singer Aretha Franklin. Released on September 9, 1971, on Atlantic Records, the compilation contains three new recordings: "Spanish Harlem", "You're All I Need to Get By" and "Bridge Over Troubled Water".

Track listing

Side 1
"Spanish Harlem" (Jerry Leiber, Phil Spector) – 3:30
"Chain of Fools" (Don Covay) – 2:45
"Don't Play That Song (You Lied)" (Ahmet Ertegun, Betty Nelson) – 2:48
"I Say a Little Prayer" (Burt Bacharach, Hal David) – 3:30
"Dr. Feelgood" (Aretha Franklin, Ted White) – 3:18
"Let It Be" (John Lennon, Paul McCartney) – 3:28
"Do Right Woman – Do Right Man" (Dan Penn, Chips Moman) – 3:15

Side 2
"Bridge over Troubled Water" (Paul Simon) – 5:31
"Respect" (Otis Redding) – 2:26
"Baby I Love You" (Ronnie Shannon) – 2:39
"(You Make Me Feel Like) A Natural Woman" (Gerry Goffin, Jerry Wexler, Carole King) – 2:39
"I Never Loved a Man (The Way I Love You)" (Ronnie Shannon) – 2:47
"You're All I Need to Get By" (Nickolas Ashford, Valerie Simpson) – 3:34
"Call Me" (Aretha Franklin) – 3:18

Credits
 Aretha Franklin – piano, vocals

Charts

References

1971 greatest hits albums
Aretha Franklin compilation albums
Albums produced by Jerry Wexler
Albums produced by Tom Dowd
Albums produced by Arif Mardin
Atlantic Records compilation albums